Encounter in the Air is a 2019 Albanian-language drama film written, directed and produced by Ardit Sadiku. The narrative focuses on a broadcast technician and a young man who suffers from mental illness. The young man, desperate to find asylum in a foreign country, hires the broadcast technician to film a video of him discussing his mental condition — in the hopes that the video will convince foreign officials to grant him asylum. The film screened at Tirana International Film Festival.

Plot
Blerim, an employee of a TV station, takes on a highly unusual side gig — one that immerses him in a world of mental illness, paranoia, and blurred reality. Blerim’s colleague introduces him to Drin, an unemployed young man who claims to be mentally ill — despite his neurologist’s belief that his symptoms are merely psychosomatic. Drin, convinced that he must leave his home country in order to become “well,” commissions Blerim to film a video of him discussing his unusual neurological condition — in the hopes that the clip will convince a foreign nation to grant him asylum. Blerim, tasked with shooting the video and somehow convincing his boss to broadcast it on the TV station, finds himself obsessed with the project — to the detriment of his professional and personal relationships.

Cast

 Herton Meta as Blerim
 Todi Kasemi as Drin
 Auron Mimaj as Gëzim
 Sajmir Pepushaj as Ilir
 Sebina Matlija as Mira
 Mirsad Çanga as Albert
 Gerti Palali as Arbër

See also 
 Cinema of Albania

References

External links

Films directed by Ardit Sadiku
2019 films
Albanian-language films
Albanian drama films